Central meridian may mean:

 Central meridian (planets), the meridian that goes through the centre of the body's disc as seen from the point of view of the observer
 Central meridian (map projections), a line used to define the origin of some map projections

See also
 Prime meridian, any of many central meridians used to define the origin of terrestrial or planetary longitudes
 Principal meridian, a meridian used for survey control in a large region.